Another Disc, Another Dollar is the second and final EP by the New Zealand band the Stones, released in 1983. It was reissued as part of the Three Blind Mice compilation, in 2015.

It peaked at No. 33 on the New Zealand charts.

Track listing
Side A
Gunner Ho    
Funky Conversations    
At The Cafe    
Side B
Fad World    
Final Days

Personnel
Jeff Batts (bass, vocals)
Graeme Anderson (drums, organ)
Wayne Elsey (guitar, vocals)

References

1983 EPs
The Stones (band) albums
Rock EPs
Flying Nun Records EPs